Kim Myhr (born 17 December 1981 in Trondheim, Norway) is a Norwegian guitarist and composer in the field of experimental music.

Career 
Kim Myhr (born 1981) is an active voice of the creative music scene in Norway, both as a composer and as a guitarist, with frequent performances throughout Europe, Australia, Asia and North- as well as South-America.

As a composer, Myhr wrote "stems and cages" for the Trondheim Jazz Orchestra in 2009, a large ensemble including Sidsel Endresen, Christian Wallumrød, Jim Denley among others. The music was released on the CD "stems and cages" in 2010. Kim wrote a second piece for the orchestra for the 2012 Ultima festival called "In the end his voice will be the sound of paper", this time featuring the voice of Jenny Hval.  Myhr works frequently with dance, notably writing music for productions by Italian choreographer Francesco Scavetta, and in 2014 a new collaboration with dancer Orfee Schuijt.

Myhr's first solo record "All your limbs singing" was released March 2014. His solo music explores the acoustic possibilities of the 12-string guitar, and can remind the listener of early music of Ligeti and of Morton Feldman, but it also contains an energy and simplicity similar to American folk music.

Myhr is also one third of MURAL, a trio with Australian wind player Jim Denley and percussionist Ingar Zach. They have worked together since 2007, and have released two CDs; Nectars of Emergence (2010) and "Live at the Rothko Chapel" (2011). The latter is a documentation of a continuing relationship with the Rothko Chapel in Houston.

Honors 
2008: JazZtipend at the Moldejazz

Discography

Solo 
2016: Bloom (Hubro)
2017: You I Me (Hubro)

With Burkhard Beins, Kari Rønnekleiv and Nils Ostendorf
2011: Live at Ringve Museum Trondheim 2011 (Audition)
2014: All Your Limbs Singing (Sofa)

With Trondheim Jazz Orchestra featuring Jenny Hval
2016: In The End His Voice Will Be The Sound Of Paper (Hubro)

Collaborations 
Within 'Spin Ensemble' including Nils Ostendorf, Philippe Lauzier, Martin Taxt and Toma Gouband
2005: Spin Ensemble (Spin)

With Philippe Lauzier, Pierre-Yves Martel and Martin Tétreault
2008: Disparation De L'Usine Éphémere (Ambiances Magnétiques)

With Jim Denley
2009: Systems Realignment (either/OAR)

With Jim Denley, Philippe Lauzier, Pierre-Yves Martel and Éric Normand
2010: Transition De Phase (Tour De Bras)

With Trondheim Jazz Orchestra
2010: Stems And Cages (MNJ)

Within 'Mural' including Ingar Zach and Jim Denley
2010: Nectars of Emergence (Sofa)
2011: Live at the Rothko Chapel (Rothko Chapel Productions)

Within 'Silencers' including Toma Gouband, Benoît Delbecq and Nils Ostendorf
2011: Balance Des Blancs (Sofa)

Within 'Muringa' including Klaus Ellerhusen Holm, Tor Haugerud & Martin Taxt
2012: The Unknown Knowns (Sofa)

References

External links 

Kim Myhr – 12-string guitar solo en *matik-matik* on YouTube

1981 births
Living people
Musicians from Oslo
Avant-garde jazz guitarists
21st-century guitarists